The 2008–09 season is FC Metalist Kharkiv's 64th season in existence and the club's 5th consecutive season in the top flight of Ukrainian football. In addition to the domestic league, Metalist Kharkiv participated in that season's editions of the Ukrainian Cup and the UEFA Cup. The season covers the period from 1 July 2008 to 30 June 2009.

Players

First team squad
Squad at end of season

Left club during season

Competitions

Overall record

Ukrainian Premier League

League table

Results summary

Results by round

Results

Ukrainian Cup

UEFA Cup

First round

Group stage

Knockout stage

Round of 32

Round of 16

References

FC Metalist Kharkiv
FC Metalist Kharkiv seasons